Natural Balance is the fifth album by American jazz group the String Trio of New York recorded in 1986 for the Italian Black Saint label.

Reception
The Allmusic review by Scott Yanow awarded the album 4 stars stating "The six group originals on this set cover a great deal of ground and range from the accessible to the esoteric. An excellent outing".

Track listing
 "One for Frankfurt TV" (Billy Bang, James Emery) - 6:26 
 "Seven Vice" (John Lindberg) - 7:10 
 "Texas Koto Blues" (Emery) - 7:32 
 "Ground Work" (Lindberg) - 6:54 
 "Shadows in the Light" (Emery) - 8:42 
 "Going Through (Art Theme for A. R. Penck)" (Bang) - 5:38
Recorded at Barigozzi Studio in Milano, Italy on April 1 & 2, 1986

Personnel
Billy Bang - violin
James Emery - guitar
John Lindberg - bass

References

Black Saint/Soul Note albums
String Trio of New York albums
1986 albums